Rachel Viollet (born 11 February 1972) is a former ranked professional British tennis player and film producer. She played collegiate tennis for the Miami Hurricanes at the University of Miami in Coral Gables, Florida.

Biography
Viollet, who was born in Manchester, has lived in the United States since the age of two. She is the daughter of Dennis Viollet, a Manchester United footballer who was a member of the famed Busby Babes and a survivor of the Munich air disaster. Much of her childhood was spent in Jacksonville, Florida, where her father coached football.

Her early appearances on the WTA Tour came at the Amelia Island Championships in Florida. She featured in the doubles main draw on three occasions.

From 1991 to 1995 she studied at the University of Miami, which kept her away from the tour. As a member of the collegiate tennis team she had her best season in 1995 when she was the "Big East Player of the Year", made the quarter-finals of the NCAA Championships, and finished the season as the #4 ranked singles player in the nation.  She graduated in 1995 with a film production degree.

She played as a qualifier in the main draw of the singles at the 1995 Amelia Island Championships.

At the 1996 Wimbledon Championships she received a wildcard into the singles main draw. She defeated fellow British wildcard Megan Miller in the first round, then was beaten by 16th seed Martina Hingis in the second round. In 1996 Viollet was the number one ranked female British professional tennis player.

Viollet continued playing on the tour until 1997, then took time away to look after her father, who was suffering from brain cancer. In 2000 she returned to tennis and featured mainly on the ITF circuit.

In 2002, at the age of 30, she debuted for the Great Britain Fed Cup team. She played two matches, both wins, over Malta's Sarah Wetz in singles and partnering Lucie Ahl in doubles against Norway. In June that year she made her second Wimbledon appearance. She lost to Magdalena Maleeva in the first round of the singles and also featured in the women's doubles with Anne Keothavong.

The University of Miami inducted Viollet into its Sports Hall of Fame in 2007.

In 2016, Viollet released the documentary “Dennis Viollet: A United Man”, which premiered on Manchester United Television Network. The film tells the story of her father, a Manchester United soccer player who survived the Munich air-crash and moved to America in the 1960s, where he helped pioneer professional soccer.

ITF finals

Singles (1-1)

Doubles (1–1)

See also
List of Great Britain Fed Cup team representatives

References

External links
 
 
 
 

1972 births
Living people
British female tennis players
English female tennis players
Tennis people from Greater Manchester
Tennis people from Florida
English emigrants to the United States
Miami Hurricanes women's tennis players
Sportspeople from Manchester